State Route 96 (SR-96) is a state highway in the U.S. state of Utah, connecting SR-264 and the town of Scofield to US-6 in a span of . The route is known as the Eccles Canyon Scenic Byway, part of The Energy Loop, a National Scenic Byway.

Route description

The highway begins in the town of Clear Creek, Utah and heads north as a two-lane undivided highway. The route then reaches SR-264 and turns east on the Eccles Canyon Scenic Byway as a continuation of SR-264. Past this intersection, the road turns north-northwest and soon enters Scofield. Past Scofield, the route continues northwesterly to pass the west shore of the Scofield Reservoir. On the northwestern side of the Reservoir, SR-96 passes on the Scofield Dam and then heads north, north-northwest, and due east to terminate at US-6, south of Soldier Summit and northeast of Helper.

History

The highway was relocated during the construction of the Scofield Dam in 1943 by the W.W. Clyde Company of Springville, Utah. During 1945, SR-96 was completed crossing the old spillway and connecting it with the dam. From the south end of the dam, it connected to the old route, continuing into Scofield.

Major intersections

See also

 List of state highways in Utah

References

External links

096
 096
 096
096